The  is a public junior college affiliated with University of Shizuoka and located in Suruga-ku, Shizuoka, Japan. It was founded in 1951 as a junior college exclusively for women, and became coeducational in 1987.

Departments 
 Department of Social Welfare
 Department of Dental Hygiene
 Department of Nursing

External links
  

Junior College
Japanese junior colleges
Universities and colleges in Shizuoka Prefecture
Public universities in Japan